The Port of Manila refers to the collective facilities and terminals that process maritime trade function in harbors in Metro Manila. Located in the Port Area and Tondo districts of Manila, Philippines, facing Manila Bay, it is the largest and the premier international shipping gateway to the country. The Philippine Ports Authority, a government-owned corporation, manages the Port of Manila and most of the public ports in the country. It is composed of 3 major facilities, namely Manila North Harbor, Manila South Harbor, and the Manila International Container Terminal.

History

Trade in Manila Bay dates at least ninth to twelfth centuries when Manila traded with neighboring countries including China and Japan, with ties to India through the areas that are now Malaysia and Indonesia. During the Spanish Colonial Era of the Philippines Manila handled trade with China and other East Asian countries, with Mexico, with Arab countries, and directly with Spain from the 16th to mid-19th century when the port was opened to all trade.  This was the galleon trade that connected the Philippines to Spain via Mexico, another Spanish territory.  From the end of the galleon trade, through the American Colonial Era of the Philippines and Philippine independence, until today, the Port of Manila has been the main port of the Philippines for both domestic and international trade.

The port is part of the Maritime Silk Road that runs from the Chinese coast to the south via Singapore towards the southern tip of India, to Mombasa, then through the Suez Canal to the Mediterranean with its connections to Central and Eastern Europe.

Location
Mariveles, in the province of Bataan, is an anchorage just inside the northern entrance, and Sangley Point is the former location of Cavite Naval Base. On either side of the bay are volcanic peaks topped with tropical foliage.  to the north is the Bataan Peninsula and to the south is the province of Cavite.

Facilities

Manila North Harbor
Manila North Harbor (seaport code:MNN), occupies a  area in Tondo, Manila and is operated by the Manila North Harbour Port Inc., a subsidiary of International Container Terminal Services Inc.  It has 7 piers (numbered with even numbers: 2, 4, 6, 8, 10, 12 and 14). North Harbor is through Radial Road 10.

The North Port Passenger Terminal, opened in 2013, can accommodate 2–3 million passengers sailing on inter-island ferries to cities throughout the archipelago. It is the main hub of 2GO ferry company, the largest inter-island ferry company in the Philippines.

Manila South Harbor

Manila South Harbor (seaport code:MNS), is a  port facility located in Port Area, Manila operated by Asian Terminals Incorporated, with 5 piers numbered with odd-numbers 3, 5, 9, 13 and 15. It is accessible through Bonifacio Drive and has a passenger terminal located between Pier 13 and 15 namely Eva Macapagal Super Terminal. It was formerly the main hub of 2GO ferry company. As of April 29, 2014, The management has installed a new Liebherr quay crane to increase the efficiency of Manila South Harbor.

Manila International Container Terminal

Manila International Container Terminal (seaport code:MNL) is operated by International Container Terminal Services Inc. It is one of Asia's major seaports and one of the Philippines' most active ports. It is located between the Manila North Harbor and the Manila South Harbor and can be accessed by road through MICT South Access Road.

In 2019, Manila International Container Terminal ranked 29th in the list of world's busiest container ports with Twenty-foot equivalent units (TEUs) of 5,315. Inaugurated on July 7, 2012, Berth 6 became fully operational and increased the Port's annual capacity by 450,000 TEUs.

 
'

Future plans
With Berth 6 in operation, ICTSI is scheduled to finish Phase 1 development of Yard 7 by yearend and increase MICT's import capacity by 18 percent.
 
South of Metro Manila, ICTSI's Laguna Gateway Inland Container Terminal (LGICT) has finished its Phase 1 development.  The inland container depot (ICD), which serves as an extension of the MICT, adds 250,000 TEUs to MICT's annual capacity.  It will be connected to Manila through the revival of the Manila-Calamba cargo intermodal system, which ceased operations in 2000 due to lower demand.

Transportation and infrastructure connections

Buses 
Since the implementation of Rationalized Bus Routes in Metro Manila, the Port Area is directly served by buses plying the route between Monumento in Caloocan and PITX in Parañaque using Roxas and Mel Lopez Boulevards.

Access to/from the NLEX 
The NLEX Harbor Link, an expressway that connects with the main line North Luzon Expressway (NLEX) at the Smart Connect Interchange in Valenzuela up to Radial Road 10 (R-10) in Navotas, serves as an alternative road to the Manila North Harbor especially for the cargo trucks entering the port coming from Northern and Central Luzon, without a truck ban, and also eases traffic congestion at A. Bonifacio Avenue and 5th Avenue.

Future projects

Pier 4 LRT station

The Pier 4 station is the future western terminus of Manila Light Rail Transit System Line 2 (LRT-2). It will be constructed near the North Port Passenger Terminal located at Pier 4 of Manila North Harbor along Mel Lopez Boulevard. The west extension of LRT-2 will also serve as a rail transport connection to the Port of Manila.

North-South Harbor Bridge

The Department of Public Works and Highways (DPWH) is also proposing to construct a bridge crossing the Pasig River between North Harbor and South Harbor.

NLEX-CAVITEX Port Expressway Link / Harbor Link Port Access Mobility Facility
A proposed expressway in NLEX–CAVITEX Port Expressway Link or Harbor Link Port Access Mobility Facility is being planned to connect the existing Navotas Interchange of NLEX Harbor Link to Manila–Cavite Expressway (CAVITEX) or Anda Circle, respectively. It will run above the existing alignment of Mel Lopez Boulevard.

See also
Battle of Manila (1945)
Naval Base Manila
List of East Asian ports
North Port Passenger Terminal
Port Area, Manila

References

Further reading
 Port of Manila: Review and History World Port Source, 2005–2014

External links
 Manila North Harbor Port
 Manila South Harbor
 Manila International Container Terminal
 AAPA- Statistics

Manila
Manila Bay
Transportation in Manila
Buildings and structures in Port Area, Manila
Buildings and structures in Tondo, Manila
Transportation in Luzon
Spanish colonial infrastructure in the Philippines